Route 192 may refer to:

In bus transportation:
 London Buses route 192, England
 Greater Manchester bus route 192, England
 Former West Midlands bus routes 192 and 194, England

In road transportation:
List of highways numbered 192